Italy competed at the 1966 European Indoor Games in Dortmund, West Germany, on 27 March 1966.

Medalists

Top eight

Three Italian athletes and the relay team reached the top eight in this edition of the championships.
Men

Women
In this edition of the championships no women from the Italian national team participated..

See also
 Italy national athletics team

References

External links
 EAA official site 

1966
1966 European Indoor Games
1966 in Italian sport